The 1968–69 BBC2 Floodlit Trophy was the fourth occasion on which the BBC2 Floodlit Trophy competition had been held.
This year was a new name on the  trophy after Castleford's three year winning streak came to an end.
Wigan won the trophy by beating St. Helens by the score of 7-4
The match was played at Central Park, Wigan, (historically in the county of Lancashire). The attendance was 13,479 and receipts were £3,291
This was to be Wigan's only success in the  competition.

Background 
This season saw no changes in the  entrants, no new members and no withdrawals, the number remaining at eighteen.
However the  format was changed slightly with the  games in the  preliminary round being on a two-legged home and away basis.
This preliminary round now involved four clubs, to reduce the  numbers to sixteen, followed by a straightforward knock out competition.

Competition and results

Preliminary round – first leg 
Involved  2 matches and 4 clubs

Preliminary round – second leg 
Involved  2 matches with the  same 4 Clubs with reverse fixtures

Round 1 – first round 
Involved  8 matches and 16 clubs

Round 2 – quarter finals 
Involved 4 matches with 8 clubs

Round 3 – semi-finals  
Involved 2 matches and 4 clubs

Final

Teams and scorers 

Scoring - Try = three (3) points - Goal = two (2) points - Drop goal = two (2) points

The road to success 
This tree excludes any preliminary round fixtures

Notes and comments 
1 * Rothmans Rugby League Yearbook 1990-91 and 1991-1992 and "100 Years of Rugby. The History of Wakefield Trinity 1873-1973" give the score as 18–0 but as obvious error in the wonderfully detailed independent WEB "Wakefield 'till I die" gives the score as 13-0
2 * This match was televised
3 * Hull F.C. (who joined the competition in season 1967-68) play their first game at home in the competition
4 * Rochdale Hornets, who joined the  competition in season 1966-67, win their first game in the  competition
5 * Keighley (who joined the competition in season 1967-68) play their first game at home in the competition
6 * The attendance was a record at that time
7  * Central Park was the home ground of Wigan with a final capacity of 18,000, although the record attendance was  47,747 for Wigan v St Helens 27 March 1959

General information for those unfamiliar 
The Rugby League BBC2 Floodlit Trophy was a knock-out competition sponsored by the BBC and between rugby league clubs, entrance to which was conditional upon the club having floodlights. Most matches were played on an evening, and those of which the second half was televised, were played on a Tuesday evening.
Despite the competition being named as 'Floodlit', many matches took place during the afternoons and not under floodlights, and several of the entrants, including  Barrow and Bramley did not have adequate lighting. And, when in 1973, due to the world oil crisis, the government restricted the use of floodlights in sport, all the matches, including the Trophy final, had to be played in the afternoon rather than at night.
The Rugby League season always (until the onset of "Summer Rugby" in 1996) ran from around August-time through to around May-time and this competition always took place early in the season, in the Autumn, with the final taking place in December (The only exception to this was when disruption of the fixture list was caused by inclement weather)

See also 
1968–69 Northern Rugby Football League season
1968 Lancashire Cup
1968 Yorkshire Cup
BBC2 Floodlit Trophy
Rugby league county cups

References

External links
Saints Heritage Society
1896–97 Northern Rugby Football Union season at wigan.rlfans.com
Hull&Proud Fixtures & Results 1896/1897
Widnes Vikings - One team, one passion Season In Review - 1896-97
The Northern Union at warringtonwolves.org
Huddersfield R L Heritage

BBC2 Floodlit Trophy
BBC2 Floodlit Trophy